J. Walter Yeagley (April 20, 1909April 28, 1990) was a judge of the District of Columbia Court of Appeals, the highest court for the District of Columbia.

Biography 
Born in Angola, Indiana, Yeagley earned undergraduate and law degrees at the University of Michigan. After eight years in private practice in South Bend, Indiana, he went to work for the federal government, first as an FBI agent and later as an Assistant Attorney General in charge of the Justice Department's Internal Security Division. He served in that capacity from 1959 until 1970. During this time he argued before the Supreme Court in the case of  He was appointed to the D.C. Court of Appeals in 1970, took senior status in 1979, and retired to Riviera Beach, Florida, in 1984.

References

Sources 
 Hearing Before the Committee on the District of Columbia, U.S. Senate, 91st Congress, Second Session, on Judicial Nominations for District of Columbia Courts, October 12, 1970.

Judges of the District of Columbia Court of Appeals
Assistant United States Attorneys
University of Michigan alumni
1909 births
1990 deaths
People from Angola, Indiana
Indiana lawyers
20th-century American judges
University of Michigan Law School alumni
Federal Bureau of Investigation agents
20th-century American lawyers